In psychology and psychiatry, clanging or clang association refers to a mode of speech characterized by association of words based upon sound rather than concepts. For example, this may include compulsive rhyming or alliteration without apparent logical connection between words. This is associated with the irregular thinking apparent in psychotic mental illnesses (e.g. mania and schizophrenia). Gustav Aschaffenburg found that manic individuals generated these "clang-associations" roughly 10–50 times more than non-manic individuals. Aschaffenburg also found that the frequency of these associations increased for all individuals as they became more fatigued.

Clanging refers specifically to behavior that is situationally inappropriate. While a poet rhyming is not evidence of mental illness, disorganized speech that impedes the patient's ability to communicate is a disorder in itself, often seen in schizophrenia.

See also
Thought disorder
Word salad

References 

Medical signs
Thought disorders